Sterile males are deliberately produced by humans in several species for several unrelated purposes:

Sterile insect technique  for insect pest control
Cytoplasmic male sterility  for plant breeding
Sterile male plant  for plant breeding

Humans and other species